John Deere strike may refer to one of two major labor strikes at Deere & Company:

 1986–1987 John Deere strike
 2021 John Deere strike